Derek Williams may refer to:

Sports

Association football
Derek Williams (footballer, born 1922) (1922–2019), English footballer for Chester City
Derek Williams (footballer, born 1934) (1934–2014), Welsh footballer
Derek Williams (footballer, born 1937) (1937–2015), English footballer for Grimsby Town

Other sports
Derek Williams (boxer) (born 1965), English heavyweight boxer of the 1980s and 1990s
Derek Williams (sportsman) (1924–2014), former Welsh international rugby union player and first-class cricketer

Others
Derek Williams (musician) (1952–), British composer, conductor, orchestrator
Derek Williams (filmmaker) (1929–2021), British documentary film director and writer
Derek Williams (art collector) (1929–1984), Welsh collector of modern art

See also 
 Derrick Williams (disambiguation)